

Flamengo Squad changes (2009)

List of all Clube de Regatas do Flamengo in the 2009 season.

In

Out

References

List of Flamengo transfers 2009